Mount Warren Park is a residential suburb in the outer eastern area of City of Logan, Queensland, Australia. The mountain Mount Warren is within the suburb.

Geography 
The suburb is bounded to the east and south by the Albert River and its tributary Windaroo Creek, by Beaudesert–Beenleigh Road to the west and by Milne Street, Main Street and Martens Street to the north.

Mount Warren Park golf course  is in the east of the suburb beside the Albert River.

History 
Mount Warren was settled on Yugambeh land. The Queensland Daily Guardian newspaper reported that William Stanley Warren had planted a sugar crop in February 1865. Warren's estate was bounded by Milne Street, the Albert River, Windaroo Creek and Beaudesert Beenleigh Road. Warren also had Windaroo sugar plantation, planted cotton, Indian corn and told reporters he had grown wheat in 1865 also.

The region remained essentially rural until it was developed in 1974. It was named as a locality by Queensland Place Names Board on 1 May 1975. By 1976 the first residential subdivision around Rochester Drive had occurred.

On 4 February 1974, the Beenleigh State School created an Opportunity class for special education. In January 1981 it became a separate school, Beenleigh Special School.

Mount Warren Park State School opened on 27 January 1981.

During the early 1980's the estate was the site of several high profile lotteries run by the Brisbane based radio station 4BK (now B105 FM).  Major prize in the "4BK Free Home" lottery was a house & land package in the estate.  In one particular lottery, several houses were built along both sides of Schweitzer Street, with the winner given the choice of their preferred house.  These houses were open to the public in the lead up to the draw, bringing a great deal to traffic and attention to the estate.

Windaroo State School opened on 28 January 1992.

Demographics
The median age of the Mount Warren Park population was 36 years, 1 year below the national median of 37.  70.9% of people living in Mount Warren Park were born in Australia. The other top responses for country of birth were New Zealand 8.5%, England 6.2%, Scotland 0.9%, Philippines 0.7%, South Africa 0.6%.  88.5% of people spoke only English at home; the next most common languages were 0.5% Vietnamese, 0.4% German, 0.4% Khmer, 0.4% Spanish, 0.3% Polish.

Education 
Mount Warren Park State School is a government primary (Early Childhood-6) school for boys and girls at 125 Mount Warren Boulevard. In 2017, the school had an enrolment of 679 students with 61 teachers (54 full-time equivalent) and 52 non-teaching staff (33 full-time equivalent). It includes a special education program.

Windaroo State School is a government primary (Prep-6) school for boys and girls at 300 Mount Warren Boulevard. In 2017, the school had an enrolment of 936 students with 67 teachers (60 full-time equivalent) and 36 non-teaching staff (24 full-time equivalent). It includes a special education program.

Beenleigh Special School is a special primary and secondary (Prep-12) school for boys and girls at 52-74 Mount Warren Boulevard. In 2017, the school had an enrolment of 109 students with 29 teachers (27 full-time equivalent) and 50 non-teaching staff (30 full-time equivalent).

There are no secondary schools in the suburb. The nearest secondary schools are Beenleigh State High School to the north in Beenleigh and Windaroo Valley State High School to the south-west in Bahrs Scrub.

Amenities 
Beenleigh Region Uniting Church is at 32-50 Mount Warren Boulevard.

References

External links